The church Santo Stefano di Sessano is all that remains of the village of Sessano, located on the rocky foreland to the east of the village of Chiaverano, which may have been abandoned after a landslide.

The 11th-century building has the characteristic features of the Romanesque churches in the area, such as the belltower in the center of the façade.

The actual building has a single nave three bays and an end apse. The sacristy was added to the apse during the Baroque period. The outside the apse is decorated with four lesene and twelve niches. Inside it preserves precious frescoes from the 11th century, featuring Christ and the four Evangelists, with 14 figures below representing the Apostles and saints.

Bibliography
Franco Grosso, Il Cammino di San Carlo, 2011

See also

Path of Saint Charles

Tourist attractions in Piedmont
Romanesque architecture in Piedmont